Osiier is a surname. Notable people with the surname include:

Ellen Osiier (1890–1962), Danish fencer
Ivan Joseph Martin Osiier (1888–1965), Danish fencer

See also
Osier (disambiguation)